Pierre Joseph Chardigny (1794–1866) was a French sculptor and medal designer.

Early life
Pierre Joseph Chardigny was born in 1794 in Aix-en-Provence. His father, Barthélémy-François Chardigny, was a sculptor. He learned sculpture from François Joseph Bosio.

Career
Chardigny designed many sculptures, some of which are held in the permanent collections of the Metropolitan Museum of Art, the Princeton University Art Museum, the Château de Pau, and the Musée Baron-Martin. 

Chardigny suggested the design of a 100-foot statue in the shape of William Shakespeare in London, where visitors could go in, but it was turned down on the grounds that it would dehumanize him.

Death
Chardigny died in 1866.

References

1794 births
1866 deaths
People from Aix-en-Provence
French male sculptors
19th-century French sculptors
19th-century French male artists